Sarah Cordelia Mellon Scaife (December 10, 1903 – December 28, 1965) was an American heiress and Republican Party donor.

Early life
Sarah was born on December 10, 1903.  She was the daughter of Jennie Taylor Mellon (1870–1938; née King) and Richard B. Mellon, a noted banker, industrialist, and philanthropist.

Her paternal grandfather was Judge Thomas Mellon and her uncle was Andrew W. Mellon, a Secretary of the Treasury during the Great Depression and U.S. Ambassador to the Court of St. James'. She was one of the heirs to the Mellon fortune, including Mellon Bank and major investments in Gulf Oil and Alcoa.  Her maternal grandparents were merchant Alexander King and Sarah Cordelia (née Smith) King.

In 1957, when Fortune prepared its first list of the wealthiest Americans, it estimated that Sarah Mellon, her brother Richard King Mellon, and her cousins Ailsa Mellon-Bruce and Paul Mellon were all amongst the richest eight people in the United States, with fortunes of between $400 and $700 million each.

Personal life
In 1927, Sarah was married to Alan Magee Scaife (1900–1958), an industrialist who was president chairman of the Scaife Company. Together, they were the parents of:

 Cordelia Mellon Scaife (1928–2005), a philanthropist. She was married for six months to Herbert Arthur May Jr. (1919–1969) before their divorce. In 1973 she married Allegheny County District Attorney Robert Duggan (1926–1974).
 Richard Mellon Scaife (1932–2014), who was the owner–publisher of the Pittsburgh Tribune-Review.

Sarah's husband died in 1958, and she died at West Penn Hospital on December 28, 1965. After a funeral at the East Liberty Presbyterian Church (built with funds from her family), she was buried at Allegheny Cemetery in Pittsburgh.  After her death, her collection of furniture and art was sold by the Parke-Bernet Galleries in New York while her jewelry was sold by William J. Fischer.

References

External links

1903 births
1965 deaths
Mellon family
People from Pittsburgh
Presbyterians from Pennsylvania
American people of Scotch-Irish descent
Burials at Allegheny Cemetery